The Qatar Financial Centre (‘QFC’) is an onshore business and financial centre located in Doha, Qatar, providing legal and regulatory services for local and international companies.

The platform was established in March 2005. In June 2015, Yousuf Mohamed Al-Jaida, was appointed the Board Member and Chief Executive Officer of the QFC.

Registered entities gain access to QFC’s own legal, regulatory, tax and business environment, set up to contribute to Qatar’s national diversification and development plans. The QFC welcomes a broad range of financial and non-financial services, that support the development of Qatar and the wider region, and currently has over 1,400 firms registered on its platform.

Background 
Qatar Financial Centre (QFC) affiliates include the Qatar Financial Centre Regulatory Authority (QFCRA), an independent financial regulator, and the Qatar International Court and Dispute Resolution Centre (QICDRC), an independent judiciary consisting of a Civil and Commercial Court and a Regulatory Tribunal. In 2019, QFC unveiled its 2022 strategic roadmap focusing on key clusters poised for growth including digital, media, sports and financial services sectors.

QFC Benefits 
The Qatar Financial Centre is an onshore business and financial centre that allows companies to operate in Qatar and the wider Middle East region within a legal and tax environment aligned to international standards. 

QFC allows up to 100% foreign ownership, 100% repatriation of profits, and charges a rate of 10% corporate tax on locally-sourced profits. Its legal, judicial, and regulatory framework is based on English common law and international best practice, with an independent court, regulatory tribunal, and dispute-resolution centre.

Payments of dividends, interest, royalties, and management fees out of Qatar by QFC companies are free from withholding tax, enabling tax-free repatriation of returns and profits for shareholders. Qatar currently holds Double Taxation Agreements with over 80 countries, charges no personal income tax, wealth tax or Zakat.

Board of Directors and Executive committee 
The Qatar Financial Centre Board of Directors includes H.E. Sheikh Mohammed Bin Hamad Bin Qassim Al-Abdullah Al-Thani, Chairman and Minister of Commerce and Industry, Yousuf Mohamed Al-Jaida, Board Member and Chief Executive Officer, Rashid Ali Al-Mansoori, Board Member, Ahmad Abdulla Ahmad Jassim Al-Jamal, Board Member, Bob Wigley, Board Member, and Dr Arnab Banerji, Board Member.

The Executive Committee is made up of Yousuf Mohamed Al-Jaida, Board Member and Chief Executive Officer, Nasser Al-Taweel, Deputy CEO, Chief Legal Officer and Board Secretary, Sheikha Alanoud bint Hamad Al Thani, Deputy CEO & Chief Business Officer, Hamed Al-Saadi, Chief Financial and Tax Officer, Abdulla Mohamed Al-Hajri, Chief Operating Officer, and Henk Jan Hoogendoorn, Chief of Financial Sector Office.

Focus Sectors 
Operating across four focus sectors – Financial Services, Sports, and Digital and Media – the QFC has launched a variety of initiatives in recent years to support Qatar’s non-oil sectors, including the QFC Tech Circle, a shared working space for tech firms, and QFC Tech Talk Series, a knowledge-exchange platform.

Apart from Qatar itself, which is working to raise the capacity of its financial services to support more than $200 billion worth of infrastructure projects, the QFC also provides a conduit for financial services providers to access nearly $1 trillion of investment across the GCC over the next decade.

See also
Economy of Qatar

References

External links
 https://www.cnbc.com/2021/01/14/qatar-financial-center-wants-to-attract-25-billion-of-foreign-investments-by-2022-as-gulf-rift-ends.html
 https://thepeninsulaqatar.com/article/13/10/2021/QFC-hosts-roundtable-on-new-data-protection-regulations
 https://www.addleshawgoddard.com/en/insights/insights-briefings/2021/real-estate/qatar-financial-centre-issues-new-real-estate-ownership-regulations/
 https://m.gulf-times.com/story/702078/Qatar-PMI-hits-record-high-in-September-QFC
 https://m.thepeninsulaqatar.com/article/06/07/2021/QFC-Authority-imposes-public-censure-against-Time-International
 https://markets.businessinsider.com/news/stocks/waifcs-new-report-highlights-the-role-of-innovation-and-fintechs-in-post-pandemic-economic-recovery-1029909648
 https://m.gulf-times.com/story/677743/QFC-well-suited-to-serve-as-a-hub-for-aircraft-financing-and-leasing-Al-Jaida
 https://thepeninsulaqatar.com/article/26/10/2020/QFC-virtually-connects-world%E2%80%99s-financial-hubs-to-Qatar%E2%80%99s-buoyant-market
 https://islamicmarkets.com/articles/qfc-and-rwanda-finance-sign-mou-to-promote-mutual-collaboration
 https://thepeninsulaqatar.com/article/13/09/2021/QFC,-Rwanda-Finance-sign-agreement-to-promote-mutual-collaboration
 https://bctaxlaw.com/qfc-rwanda-finance-sign-agreement-to-promote-mutual-collaboration/
 https://m.gulf-times.com/story/702078/Qatar-PMI-hits-record-high-in-September-QFC
 https://www.gulf-times.com/story/696381/QFC-records-steady-growth-in-new-firms-in-H1-2021
 https://worldakkam.com/qfc-qatar-museum-signs-memorandum-of-understanding-to-promote-cultural-entrepreneurship/107769/

Financial services companies established in 2005
Economy of Qatar
Financial services companies of Qatar
2005 establishments in Qatar